Louis François Antoine Arbogast (4 October 1759 – 8 April 1803) was a French mathematician. He was born at Mutzig in Alsace and died at Strasbourg, where he was professor. He wrote on series and the derivatives known by his name: he was the first writer to separate the symbols of operation from those of quantity, introducing systematically the operator notation DF for the derivative of the function F. In 1800, he published a calculus treatise where the first known statement of what is currently known as Faà di Bruno's formula appears, 55 years before the first published paper of Francesco Faà di Bruno on that topic.

Biography 

 
He was professor of mathematics at the Collège de Colmar and entered a mathematical competition run by the St Petersburg Academy. His entry was to bring him fame and an important place in the history of the development of the calculus. Arbogast submitted an essay to the St Petersburg Academy in which he came down firmly on the side of Euler. In fact he went much further than Euler in the type of arbitrary functions introduced by integrating partial differential equations, claiming that the functions could be discontinuous not only in the limited sense claimed by Euler, but discontinuous in a more general sense that he defined that allowed the function to consist of portions of different curves. Arbogast won the prize with his essay and his notion of discontinuous function became important in Cauchy's more rigorous approach to analysis.

In 1789 he submitted in Strasbourg a major report on the differential and integral calculus to the Académie des Sciences in Paris which was never published. In the Preface of a later work he described the ideas that prompted him to write the major report of 1789. Essentially he realised that there was no rigorous methods to deal with the convergence of series, and Arbogast's career reached new heights. In addition to his mathematics post, he was appointed as professor of physics at the Collège Royal in Strasbourg and from April 1791 he served as its rector until October 1791 when he was appointed rector of the University of Strasbourg; in 1794 he was appointed Professor of Calculus at the École centrale des travaux publics et militarisée (soon to become École Polytechnique) but he taught at the École préparatoire.

His contributions to mathematics show him as a philosophical thinker. As well as introducing discontinuous functions, as we discussed above, he conceived the calculus as operational symbols. The formal algebraic manipulation of series investigated by Lagrange and Laplace in the 1770s has been put in the form of operator equalities by Arbogast in 1800. We owe him the general concept of factorial as a product of a finite number of terms in arithmetic progression.

The original version of this article was taken from the public domain resource the Rouse History of Mathematics.

See also 
Discontinuous function
Operational calculus

Notes

References

General references
 Available from Persee.

.
. Available from Persee.
. Maybe the earliest biography of Arbogast, printed only few years after his death. Entirely freely available from Google books.
 (Review of the first edition), available from Project Gutenberg.
 Available from Persee.
.

Scientific references
, Entirely freely available from Google books.
.
. A well-known paper where Francesco Faà di Bruno presents the two versions of the formula that now bears his name, published in the journal founded by Barnaba Tortolini.

Further reading

External links
 

1759 births
1803 deaths
18th-century French mathematicians
19th-century French mathematicians